Der Clown is a German television series that aired between 21 April 1998 and 11 October 2001. It ran for 46 episodes and starred Sven Martinek, Diana Frank, Thomas Anzenhofer, and Volkmar Kleinert.

Story
The story is about Max Zander, an agent from WIPA (World Intelligence Police Agency). When his friend dies in car bomb meant for him, Max decides to fake his own death and live as a phantom, known only as "The Clown", and fight crime. He gets help from his friends, journalist Claudia Diehl (Diana Frank), pilot Tobias "Dobbs" Steiger (Thomas Anzenhofer), and lawyer Joseph Ludowski (Volkmar Kleinert).

Film
On 24 March 2005, the movie , a film sequel to the TV series, was released in German cinemas.

References

External links
 

1998 German television series debuts
2001 German television series endings
German action television series
German-language television shows
RTL (German TV channel) original programming
Superhero television shows
Television superheroes